Shegovary is a rural locality (a selo) in Shenkursky District, Arkhangelsk Oblast, Russia. The population was 524 as of 2012. There is 14 streets.

Geography 
Shegovary is located on the Vaga River, 45 km north of Shenkursk (the district's administrative centre) by road. Krasnaya Gorka is the nearest rural locality.

References 

Rural localities in Shenkursky District
Shenkursky Uyezd